Stobrawa  is a village in the administrative district of Gmina Popielów, within Opole County, Opole Voivodeship, in south-western Poland.

The village lies on the Stobrawa river, within the protected area called Stobrawa Landscape Park.

References

Stobrawa